Abdi is a male name. It is a given name used in several countries with different origins. The Oromo version of the name, used within Ethiopia, translates to ‘Hope’. Among others, one version has Arabic has meaning which is loosely translated as 'servant of God'.

Arabic name
While Arabic speakers commonly use Abdu (‎ /  ) rather than Abdi, both are nicknames for Abdul. It originates from the Arabic word   /  / . The name translates as "servant of God" in reference to religious submission to Allah (God). As such, it is often used by Muslims around the world in conjunction with one of the names of God in Islam, but also sometimes on its own.

Biblical name
Abdi is the name of three men in the Hebrew Bible. In Hebrew, Abdi (עַבְדִּ֖י) literally means "my servant", but may be an abbreviation for "servant of "Yahweh".
In  Abdi is a Levite of the family of Merari.
In  Abdi is a Levite in the time of King Hezekiah of Judah. This may be the same man as in 1 Chronicles 6:44.
In Ezra  Abdi is the son of Elam, and one of a long list of men who had married foreign wives, and who then sent them away together with their children.

Given name
Abdi-Ashirta (14th century BC), Canaanite ruler of Amurru
Abdi-Heba (14th century BC.), Canaanite chieftain of Jerusalem
Abdi-Milkutti (7th century BC), Sidonian king
Abdi-Riša (14th century BC), Phoenician ruler of Enišasi
Abdi Behravanfar, Iranian singer-songwriter
Abdi Bile (born 1962), Somali athlete, World Champion
Abdi Faras (born 1989), Somali basketball player
Abdi İpekçi (1929–1979), Turkish journalist
Abdi Kassim, Zanzibari footballer
Abdi Pasha (disambiguation), various Ottoman people
Abdi Toptani (1864–1942), Albanian politician

Middle name
Hamza Abdi Barre (born 1972), prime minister of Somalia
Mohamed Abdi Mohamed, Somali anthropologist and politician

Surname
Abbas Abdi (born 1956), Iranian politician
Abdi Sheik Abdi (born 1942), Somali author
Guled Abdi, 1st Grand Sultan of the Isaaq clan
Abed Abdi, Palestinian artist
Akbar Abdi (born 1960), Iranian actor and comedian
Almen Abdi (born 1986), Swiss footballer
Bahador Abdi (born 1984), Iranian footballer
Barkhad Abdi (born 1985), Somali American actor and director
Behzad Abdi (born 1973), Iranian composer
Dekha Ibrahim Abdi, Somali social activist
Hawa Abdi (1947−2020), Somali physician and activist
Jumadi Abdi, Indonesian footballer
Kamyar Abdi, Iranian archaeologist
Mohammad Abdi, Iranian writer
Ugbad Abdi, American fashion model
Youcef Abdi (born 1977), Australian runner
Yusuf Hassan Abdi, Somali politician, journalist and diplomat

See also
Abdu (disambiguation), a nickname for the compound name or a given name. In this case it's not necessarily a name given to a Muslim
Abdul for further explanation
Abidi, a surname which refers to the descendants of Zayn al-Abidin
Obadiah
Abdy

References

Arabic-language surnames
Arabic masculine given names
Set index articles on Hebrew Bible people
Theophoric names